A. Krishnaswamy (born 12 December 1965) was a member of the 14th Lok Sabha of India. He represented the Sriperumbudur constituency of Tamil Nadu and is a member of the Dravida Munnetra Kazhagam (DMK) political party.

Electoral performance

References

External links
 Members of Fourteenth Lok Sabha - Parliament of India website

Living people
Indian Tamil people
Lok Sabha members from Tamil Nadu
1965 births
India MPs 2004–2009
Dravida Munnetra Kazhagam politicians
India MPs 1999–2004
People from Tiruvallur district
People from Kanchipuram district
Tamil Nadu MLAs 2021–2026